Ana Casares (1930 in Stanisławów, Poland – March 13, 2007 in Buenos Aires) was a Polish-Argentine film actress. She starred in 30 films between 1951 and 1980.

In 1933 she moved with her parents to Argentina. She studied acting skills at Heddy Krill. Since 1952 - on the stage. Since 1951, in the Argentine cinema. Casares made her debut in 1951 in the Juan Carlos Thorry film El Complejo de Felipe and in 1962 appeared in Buscando a Mónica. Since 1962, she filmed in Europe, mainly in Spain. She also played at theaters in Madrid. At the beginning of the 1970s, she returned to Buenos Aires, where she continued her acting career. After 1980 she left the cinema and theatre. Ana Casares was called the Argentine "Brigitte Bardot".

She died on 13 March 2007, aged 77, and is buried in the cemetery of La Tablada in Buenos Aires.

Filmography

1951: El complejo de Felipe
1956: El último perro
1956: El tango en París
1958: Demasiado jóvenes
1958: El Jefe
1959: Campo virgen
1959: Aquello que amamos
1960: Dos tipos con suerte
1961:  (uncredited)
1962: Searching for Monica
1962: Three Fables of Love
1963: La muerte y el leñador (Short)
1963: El diablo en vacaciones
1963: Día a día (TV Series, 2 episodes)
1963: El juego de la verdad
1964: La noche al hablar (TV Series, 1 episode)
1964: Two Gangsters in the Wild West
1963-1965: Confidencias (TV Series, 4 episodes) 
1965: Beach of Formentor
1965: El marqués
1967: Up the MacGregors
1967: Las 12 caras de Juan (TV Series, 1 episode)
1968: 1001 Nights
1969: Two Undercover Angels
1969: Adiós cordera
1969: Kiss Me Monster
1969: La vida continúa
1971: Una luz en la ciudad (TV Series, 14 episodes)
1971: Jueves sorpresa (TV Series, 1 episode)
1975: Kid Head
1975: El Pibe Cabeza
1980: Trampa para un soñador (TV Series, 97 episodes)
1981: Me caso con vos (TV Series, 18 episodes)
1981: Barracas al sur (TV Series 1981, 29 episodes)
1982: Juan sin nombre (TV Series, 39 episodes)

References

External links

1930 births
2007 deaths
Argentine film actresses
Polish emigrants to Argentina